Mozart and the Whale (released as Crazy in Love in some parts of Europe) is a 2005 romantic comedy-drama film directed by Petter Næss and starring Josh Hartnett and Radha Mitchell.

Plot
Donald Morton (Josh Hartnett) is a taxi driver with Asperger's Syndrome and drives two Japanese passengers and his pet cockatiel around Spokane, Washington. Distracted, he bumps into the back of a florist's van, damaging his stock. Unfazed, Donald and his budgie take their groceries and leave, abandoning his taxicab and passengers. He takes his groceries to the self-help group for autistic adults. Before they head to the park to meet another autistic group, he tells one member, Gracie (Rusty Schwimmer), to gather the women and he will gather the guys to practice telling personal stories, but keeps getting distracted by performing mathematical sums of the microwaves' depleting numbers. He notices that Isabelle Sorenson (Radha Mitchell), who also has Asperger's, a new name, has signed up and tells Gracie to let her go first.

At the park, Isabelle tells the women of a childhood memory: she saw that her parents were happy an Olympian had broken a record, so in order to please her parents, and taking what she heard literally, she broke their music records. Donald tells his story to the men about his ability to do complex sums, but couldn't make friends. Isabelle goes on to tell of when she was raped when she went hitch-hiking. This causes Gracie to laugh manically. Heard by Donald, he tries to calm down an angry Isabelle and they find that they have much in common and take a liking to each other.

After Isabelle talks to Gregory (John Carroll Lynch), a man also in the group who is taking notes on a notepad, he calls Donald over to ask Isabelle if she may escort him to a Halloween party on his behalf. However, before Donald has the chance, Isabelle asks Donald out for lunch. They go to the zoo the following day where Isabelle asks Donald to escort her instead of Gregory. They agree to meet in-costume Halloween night. Donald dresses as a whale but decides against attending, ultimately leaving Isabelle, dressed as Mozart, waiting. She goes to his apartment and they decide to take a walk about town and talk until the final bus is due when they share their first kiss.

Unsure when to call, Donald leaves multiple messages on her phone; she finally answers and they go to the amusement park. During a ring toss, the clanging of the metal rings hitting the bottles and the ringing of a bell cause Isabelle to scream and collapse on the floor. Donald takes her back to his filthy apartment and they agree to sleep together. The following day at the self-help group, Gregory accuses Donald of exploiting his position for sexual favors. Meanwhile, Isabelle occupies herself by waiting with Bronwin (Erica Leerhsen), one of the younger members of the group who recently learned that her father has blood cancer, until her parents pick her up.

Isabelle takes the liberty of cleaning Donald's apartment while he goes shopping. When he returns, he is horrified to see that everything is different; the piles of newspaper are stacked neatly, rotting food from the fridge is thrown away and has a new shower curtain and a toilet lid cover. He becomes angry at Isabelle for changing everything, by saying "you stole my life" before leaving again, although Isabelle thought that he would like it. He later leaves a number of apologetic messages on Isabelle's phone. The next day, he goes to the hair salon where Isabelle works as a hair stylist to apologize in person, and Isabelle forgives him, while introducing him as her boyfriend to the staff and her co-workers.

Isabelle shows Donald an abandoned rooftop, calling this a place where people who don't know where they belong can belong. She suggests that they can buy a house together and her therapist has arranged a job interview for a statistic analyst post at a university. He gets the job and they move into their new house, making it their own.

Donald tells Isabelle that he wants everything to be nice for when his boss, Wallace (Gary Cole) comes for dinner. Believing that he thinks that she doesn't keep the house nice, Isabelle spites Donald by keeping the pets uncaged, much to Donald's shock when he returns, and she maintains extroverted behavior and tells of her off-the-wall plans for the house. Donald explodes, asking how they're going to afford all that, which leads to the two of them arguing over it but when Isabelle says that they are both crazy, he retaliates by telling her that she is crazier, which leads to her throwing him out of the house. He stays with Gregory in his house, and after listening to a tearful answer message that Isabelle's rabbit, Bongo, has died, he runs to comfort her. Isabelle suggests that they should just be friends.

Donald invites Isabelle to a restaurant, where he proposes to her, much to Isabelle's dismay. She leaves abruptly back home and overdoses over the counter drug. Donald returns just in time to take her to the hospital, where Isabelle's psychiatrist advises him to leave her alone, testing his willpower to refrain from calling her.

Donald sees Isabelle leaving the university and follows her to the abandoned rooftop, where he expresses that the only nice thing he had left to give her was not to call, to find that Isabelle was waiting for his call and she missed him. They express their true love with an embrace and kiss. The movie ends with the happy couple, now married, in their home, enjoying Thanksgiving dinner with the self-help group members.

Cast
 Josh Hartnett as Donald Morton
 Sharif Shawkat as young Donald
 Radha Mitchell as Isabelle "Izzy" Sorenson
 Mercedee Smith as young Isabelle
 Rusty Schwimmer as Gracie
 Erica Leerhsen as Bronwin
 Gary Cole as Wallace
 Allen Evangelista as Skeets
 Nate Mooney as Roger
 Sheila Kelley as Janice
 John Carroll Lynch as Gregory

Production
The screenplay was written by Ron Bass, who also wrote Rain Man (1988), a film about an individual with autism. Bass is said to have been inspired by a 1995 article in the Los Angeles Times.

Distribution
The film struggled to find a theatrical distributor in the United States. The studio tried to distribute it in the United States in April 2004, but it did not go farther than a month in Spokane, Washington, where the film was made. The film is available on DVD in a number of countries and became available in the United States in that form on December 12, 2006.

Reception
The film has been criticized for perpetuating the errant media stereotype that people on the autism spectrum typically have savant skills.

References

External links
 
 
 
 
 
 Variety review

2005 films
2005 romantic comedy-drama films
American romantic comedy-drama films
2000s English-language films
Fictional couples
Films about autism
Films directed by Petter Næss
Films scored by Deborah Lurie
Films set in Washington (state)
Films shot in Washington (state)
Films with screenplays by Ronald Bass
Nu Image films
Films produced by Boaz Davidson
2000s American films
Films about disability